The 2013 European Ladies' Team Championship took place 9–13 July at Fulford Golf Club in Fulford, England. It was the 30th women's golf amateur European Ladies' Team Championship.

Venue 

The hosting Fulford Golf Club was founded in 1906. The golf course, located  2 kilometers (approximately 1 mile) south of York, North Yorkshire, England, United Kingdom, was designed by Charles MacKenzie, brother of well known golf course architect Alister MacKenzie, and opened in 1935.

Fulford had previously been home to several European Tour events, including the Benson and Hedges International Open between 1971 and 1989. In 1976 the club hosted the inaugural Women's British Open.

The championship course was set up with par 72.

Format 
All participating teams played two qualification rounds of stroke-play with six players, counted the five best scores for each team.

The eight best teams formed flight A, in knock-out match-play over the next three days. The teams were seeded based on their positions after the stroke-play. The first placed team was drawn to play the quarter final against the eight placed team, the second against the seventh, the third against the sixth and the fourth against the fifth. In each match between two nation teams, two 18-hole foursome games and five 18-hole single games were played. Teams were allowed to switch players during the team matches, selecting other players in to the afternoon single games after the morning foursome games. Teams knocked out after the quarter finals played one foursome game and four single games in each of their remaining matches. Games all square after 18 holes were declared halved, if the team match was already decided.

The eight teams placed 9–16 in the qualification stroke-play formed flight B, to play similar knock-out match-play, with one foursome game and four single games, to decide their final positions.

The three teams placed 17–19 in the qualification stroke-play formed flight C, to meet each other, with one foursome game and four single games, to decide their final positions.

Teams 
19 nation teams contested the event. Each team consisted of six players. Slovakia took part for the first time.

Players in the leading teams

Other participating teams

Winners 
Team Denmark lead  the opening 36-hole qualifying competition, with a score of 19 under par 701, 31 strokes ahead of the team on second place, team Spain. Between all the next ten teams, the difference was 25 strokes.

Individual leaders in the 36-hole stroke-play competition was Madelene Sagström, Sweden and Oona Vartiainen, Finland, each with a score of 8 under par 136, two strokes ahead of nearest competitors.

Team Spain won the championship, beating Austria 5–2 in the final and earned their fifth title.

Team Finland, earned third place, beating host nation England 4–3 in the bronze match. Finland, as well as Austria, was at the podium for the first time in the history of the championship.

Results 
Qualification round

Team standings

* Note: In the event of a tie the order was determined by the better total non-counting scores.

Individual leaders

 Note: There was no official award for the lowest individual score.

Flight A

Bracket

Final games

* Note: Game declared halved, since team match already decided.

Flight B

Bracket

Flight C

Team standings

Final standings

Sources:

See also 
 Espirito Santo Trophy – biennial world amateur team golf championship for women organized by the International Golf Federation.
 European Amateur Team Championship – European amateur team golf championship for men organised by the European Golf Association.
 European Ladies Amateur Championship – European amateur individual golf championship for women organised by the European Golf Association.

References

External links 
 European Golf Association: Results

European Ladies' Team Championship
Golf tournaments in England
European Ladies' Team Championship
European Ladies' Team Championship
European Ladies' Team Championship